is a passenger railway station in the city of Shibukawa, Gunma Prefecture, Japan, operated by East Japan Railway Company (JR East).

Lines
Onogami-Onsen Station is a station on the Agatsuma Line, and is located 13.7 kilometers from the terminus of the line at Shibukawa Station.

Station layout
The station consists of one side platform serving a single track. The station is unattended.

History
Onogami-Onsen Station opened on 14 March 1992.

Surrounding area
 Onogami Onsen

See also
 List of railway stations in Japan

External links

  

Railway stations in Gunma Prefecture
Agatsuma Line
Stations of East Japan Railway Company
Railway stations in Japan opened in 1992
Shibukawa, Gunma